Placencia Airport  is an airport that serves Placencia, Belize. It has a paved strip and crosses the peninsula from East to West.

As of December 2012, the runway is paved in good condition. Due to the typical sea breeze, takeoffs and landings are typically done east-bound. Private flights are allowed. Parking should be coordinated with Tropic Air or Maya Island Air. The airport has no security.

Common traffic advisory frequency (CTAF) is 122.8 MHz.

Airlines and destinations

Accidents and incidents
On 17 November 2017 - A Cessna 208B Grand Caravan of Tropic Air struck a vehicle shortly after take-off for Punta Gorda Airport and subsequently ditched in the sea. All seven people on board, including the Acting Prime  Minister of Belize Patrick Faber and Agriculture Minister Godwin Hulse, survived.

See also

Transport in Belize
List of airports in Belize

References

External links

OpenStreetMap - Placencia
OurAirports - Placencia
FallingRain - Placencia Airport

Airports in Belize